"Gangstaz Roll" is a 2003 single by the hip-hop group Mobb Deep. It was the group's first release on Jive Records after leaving their previous label Loud Records. The single did not enter the charts and did not appear on their subsequent album Amerikaz Nightmare. The B-side was "Clap Those Thangs" featuring 50 Cent. The group eventually signed with 50 Cent's label, G-Unit Records, in 2005.

Track listing
Side A

 Gangstaz Roll (LP Version)
 Gangstaz Roll (Clean Version)
 Gangstaz Roll (Acapella)

Side B

 Clap Those Thangs (LP Version)
 Clap Those Thangs (Clean Version)
 Clap Those Thangs (Acapella)

Charts

References

2003 songs
Mobb Deep songs
Jive Records singles
Song recordings produced by Havoc (musician)
Songs written by Prodigy (rapper)
Songs written by Havoc (musician)
Gangsta rap songs